Sopana Sangeetham is a form of Indian classical music that developed in the temples of Kerala in south India in the wake of the increasing popularity of Jayadeva's Gita Govinda or Ashtapadis.

Etymology
The name derives from two Malayalam or Sanskrit words: Sopanam and Sangeetham. The word Sopanam refers to the sacred steps of main shrine of a temple and Sangeetham refers to music.

Performance

Sopana sangeetham (music), as the very name suggests, is sung by the side of the holy steps (sopanam) leading to the sanctum sanctorum of a shrine. It is sung, typically employing plain notes, to the accompaniment of the small, hourglass-shaped ethnic drum called 'edakka' or idakka, besides the chengila or the handy metallic gong to sound the beats. Sopanam is traditionally sung by men of the Maarar and Pothuval castes of Ambalavasi (semi-Brahmin) community,  engaged to do it as their hereditary profession.

The late Njeralattu Rama Poduval of Thirumandhamkunnu bani, Janardhanan Nedungadi of Guruvayoor, Sri Jyothidas Guruvayoordasan,  Damodara Marar, a practitioner of the temple art called Mudiyettu, from Pazhoor and Sadanam Divakara Marar, master percussionist.

Now, Thrithala sreeni poduval, Porur Venugopalamarar, ambalappuzha vijaykumar, Ayilur Akhil marar are young artists...

See also
 Culture of Kerala
 Ambalavasi

References 

Arts of Kerala
Kathakali
Carnatic music
Malayalam music
Kerala music